The United States Post Office and Courthouse in Augusta, Georgia is a U-shaped building that was built during 1915-16 as a post office and courthouse, with elements of Italian Renaissance Revival architecture including creamy marble walls and a red mission tile roof. Design credit is to U.S. Supervising Architect Oscar Wenderoth.  The building was extended to the rear in 1936, and received interior modernizations in 1960 and 1971.  It was vacated and extensively rehabilitated during 1992–96. 

Also known as United States Courthouse, it was listed on the National Register of Historic Places in 2000.  It was deemed significant architecturally as an excellent example of Italian Renaissance Revival style, and historically as a symbol of Federal government presence in Augusta.

See also 
List of United States post offices

References 

National Register of Historic Places in Augusta, Georgia
Renaissance Revival architecture in Georgia (U.S. state)
Government buildings completed in 1915
Post office buildings in Georgia (U.S. state)
Courthouses in Georgia (U.S. state)
Federal courthouses in the United States
Courthouses on the National Register of Historic Places in Georgia (U.S. state)
Post office buildings on the National Register of Historic Places in Georgia (U.S. state)
1915 establishments in Georgia (U.S. state)